The troposphere is the lowest layer of the atmosphere of the Earth. It contains 75% of the total mass of the planetary atmosphere and 99% of the total mass of water vapor and aerosols, and is where most weather phenomena occur.

The term troposphere derives from the Greek words  tropos  (rotating) and sphaira (sphere) indicating that rotational turbulence mixes the layers of air and so determines the structure and the phenomena of the troposphere. The measures of the PBL vary according to the latitude, the landform, and the time of day when the meteorological measurement is realized. Atop the troposphere is the tropopause, which is the functional atmospheric border that demarcates the troposphere from the stratosphere. As such, because the tropopause is an inversion layer in which air-temperature increases with altitude, the temperature of the troposphere remains constant. The layer has the largest concentration of nitrogen.

Structure of the troposphere

Composition
In the Earth’s planetary atmosphere, a volume of dry air is composed of 78.08% nitrogen, 20.95% oxygen, 0.93% argon, 0.04% carbon dioxide, trace gases, and variable amounts of water vapor. The sources of atmospheric water vapor are the bodies of water (oceans, seas, lakes, rivers, swamps), and vegetation on the planetary surface, which humidify the troposphere through the processes of evaporation and transpiration respectively, and which influences the occurrence of weather phenomena; the greatest proportion of water vapor is in the atmosphere nearest the surface of the Earth. The temperature of the troposphere decreases at high altitude by way of the inversion layers that occur in the tropopause, which is the atmospheric boundary that demarcates the troposphere from the stratosphere. At higher altitudes, the low air-temperature consequently decreases the saturation vapor pressure, the amount of atmospheric water vapor in the upper troposphere.

Pressure
The maximum air pressure (weight of the atmosphere) is at sea level and decreases at high altitude because the atmosphere is in hydrostatic equilibrium, wherein the air pressure is equal to the weight of the air above a given point on the planetary surface. The relation between decreased air pressure and high altitude can be equated to the density of a fluid, by way of the following hydrostatic equation:

where:

gn is the standard gravity
ρ is the density

z is the altitude
P is the pressure
R is the gas constant
T is the thermodynamic (absolute) temperature
m is the molar mass

Temperature
The planetary surface of the Earth heats the troposphere by means of latent heat, thermal radiation, and sensible heat.
The gas layers of the troposphere are less dense at the geographic poles and denser at the equator, where the average height of the tropical troposphere is 13 km, approximately 7.0 km greater than the 6.0 km average height of the polar troposphere at the geographic poles; therefore, surplus heating and vertical expansion of the troposphere occur in the tropical latitudes. At the middle latitudes, tropospheric temperatures decrease from an average temperature of 15°C (59°F) at sea level to approximately −55°C (−67°F) at the tropopause. At the equator, the tropospheric temperatures decrease from an average temperature of 20°C (68°F) at sea level to approximately −70°C to −75°C (−94 to −103°F) at the tropopause. At the geographical poles, the Arctic and the Antarctic regions, the tropospheric temperature decreases from an average temperature of 0°C (32°F) at sea level to approximately −45°C (−49°F) at the tropopause.

Altitude
The temperature of the troposphere decreases with increased altitude, and the rate of decrease in air temperature is measured with the Environmental Lapse Rate which is the numeric difference between the temperature of the planetary surface and the temperature of the tropopause divided by the altitude. Functionally, the ELR equation assumes that the planetary atmosphere is static, that there is no mixing of the layers of air, either by vertical atmospheric convection or winds that could create turbulence.

The difference in temperature derives from the planetary surface absorbing most of the energy from the sun, which then radiates outwards and heats the troposphere (the first layer of the atmosphere of Earth) while the radiation of surface heat to the upper atmosphere results in the cooling of that layer of the atmosphere. The ELR equation also assumes that the atmosphere is static, but heated air becomes buoyant, expands, and rises. The dry adiabatic lapse rate (DALR) accounts for the effect of the expansion of dry air as it rises in the atmosphere, and the wet adiabatic lapse rate (WALR) includes the effect of the condensation-rate of water vapor upon the environmental lapse rate.

Compression and expansion
A parcel of air rises and expands because of the lower atmospheric pressure at high altitudes. The expansion of the air parcel pushes outwards against the surrounding air, and transfers energy (as work) from the parcel of air to the atmosphere. Transferring energy to a parcel of air by way of heat is a slow and inefficient exchange of energy with the environment, which is an adiabatic process (no energy transfer by way of heat). As the rising parcel of air loses energy while it acts upon the surrounding atmosphere, no heat energy is transferred from the atmosphere to the air parcel to compensate for the heat loss. The parcel of air loses energy as it reaches greater altitude, which is manifested as a decrease in the temperature of the air mass. Analogously, the reverse process occurs within a cold parcel of air that is being compressed and is sinking to the planetary surface.

The compression and the expansion of an air parcel are reversible phenomena in which energy is not transferred into or out of the air parcel; atmospheric compression and expansion are measured as an Isentropic Process wherein there occurs no change in entropy as the air parcel rises or falls within the atmosphere. Because the heat exchanged is related to the change in entropy ( by ) the equation governing the air temperature as a function of altitude for a mixed atmosphere is:  where  is the entropy. The isentropic equation states that atmospheric entropy does not change with altitude; the adiabatic lapse rate measures the rate at which temperature decreases with altitude under such conditions.

Humidity
If the air contains water vapor, then cooling of the air can cause the water to condense, and the air no longer functions as an ideal gas. If the air is at the saturation vapor pressure, then the rate at which temperature decreases with altitude is called the saturated adiabatic lapse rate. The actual rate at which the temperature decreases with altitude is the environmental lapse rate. In the troposphere, the average environmental lapse rate is a decrease of about 6.5°C for every 1.0 km (1,000m) of increased altitude.
For dry air, an approximately ideal gas, the adiabatic equation is:  wherein  is the heat capacity ratio for air. The combination of the equation for the air pressure yields the dry adiabatic lapse rate:.

Environment
The environmental lapse rate, at which temperature decreases with altitude, usually is unequal to the adiabatic lapse rate. If the upper air is warmer than predicted by the adiabatic lapse rate, then a rising and expanding parcel of air will arrive at the new altitude at a lower temperature than the surrounding air. In which case, the air parcel is denser than the surrounding air, and so falls back to its original altitude as an air mass that is stable against being lifted. If the upper air is cooler than predicted by the adiabatic lapse rate, then, when the air parcel rises to a new altitude, the air mass will have a higher temperature and a lower density than the surrounding air and will continue to accelerate and rise.

Tropopause

The tropopause is the atmospheric boundary layer between the troposphere and the stratosphere, and is located by measuring the changes in temperature relative to increased altitude in the troposphere and in the stratosphere. In the troposphere, the temperature of the air decreases at high altitude, however, in the stratosphere the air temperature initially is constant, and then increases with altitude. The increase of air temperature at stratospheric altitudes results from the Ozone layer’s absorption and retention of the ultraviolet (UV) radiation that Earth receives from the Sun. The coldest layer of the atmosphere, where the temperature lapse rate changes from a positive rate (in the troposphere) to a negative rate (in the stratosphere) locates and identifies the tropopause as an inversion layer in which limited mixing of air layers occurs between the troposphere and the stratosphere.

Atmospheric flow
The general flow of the atmosphere is from west to east, which, however, can be interrupted by polar flows, either north-to-south flow or a south-to-north flow, which meteorology describes as a zonal flow and as a meridional flow. The terms are used to describe localized areas of the atmosphere at a synoptic scale; the three-cell model more fully explains the zonal and meridional flows of the planetary atmosphere of the Earth.

Three Cell Model

The three-cell model of the atmosphere of the Earth describes the actual flow of the atmosphere with the tropical-latitude Hadley cell, the mid-latitude Ferrel cell, and the polar cell to describe the flow of energy and the circulation of the planetary atmosphere. Balance is the fundamental principle of the model — that the solar energy absorbed by the Earth in a year is equal to the energy radiated (lost) into outer space. That Earth’s energy balance does not equally apply to each latitude because of the varying strength of the sunlight that strikes each of the three atmospheric cells, consequent to the inclination of the axis of planet Earth within its orbit of the Sun. The resultant atmospheric circulation transports warm tropical air to the geographic poles and cold polar air to the tropics. The effect of the three cells is the tendency to the equilibrium of heat and moisture in the planetary atmosphere of Earth.

Zonal flow
A zonal flow regime is the meteorological term meaning that the general flow pattern is west to east along the Earth's latitude lines, with weak shortwaves embedded in the flow. The use of the word "zone" refers to the flow being along the Earth's latitudinal "zones". This pattern can buckle and thus become a meridional flow.

Meridional flow
When the zonal flow buckles, the atmosphere can flow in a more longitudinal (or meridional) direction, and thus the term "meridional flow" arises. Meridional flow patterns feature strong, amplified troughs of low pressure and ridges of high pressure, with more north–south flow in the general pattern than west-to-east flow.'''

See also 

 Jet stream
 Trade winds

References

External links

 U.S. National Weather Service – Layers of the Atmosphere 
 Chemical Reactions in the Atmosphere

Atmosphere
Atmosphere of Earth
Atmospheric thermodynamics